Monoceratuncus autolytus is a species of moth of the family Tortricidae. It is found in Sinaloa, Mexico.

References

Moths described in 1986
Cochylini